Conus yemenensis is a species of sea snail, a marine gastropod mollusk in the family Conidae, the cone snails and their allies.

Like all species within the genus Conus, these snails are predatory and venomous. They are capable of "stinging" humans, therefore live ones should be handled carefully or not at all.

Description

Distribution
This marine species occurs in the Gulf of Aden.

References

 Bondarev I. (1997) Description of a new conid species, from the Gulf of Aden / Descrizione di una nuova specie di Conus, dal golfo di Aden. World Shells 23: 66–70

External links
 The Conus Biodiversity website
 Cone Shells – Knights of the Sea

yemenensis
Gastropods described in 1997